Goober is a combination of peanut butter and jelly in a single jar. 
It is sold in US, the UK, Canada, Singapore, and other parts of the Commonwealth, and is named after a familiar denomination for peanut in American English, goober pea, from the Gullah name for the peanut, guber. Goober was introduced by The J.M. Smucker Company under the Smucker's brand.

About

Goober was introduced in 1968. It consists of alternating vertical stripes of peanut butter and either grape or strawberry flavored jelly, or chocolate.
There is also a Goober variant that consists of alternating vertical stripes of Honey and chocolate.

Similar products
A similar product is sold by Kroger under their subsidiary Ralphs brand name as: Yipes!  Stripes! under Kroger's Disney Magic Selections label.

External links

Smucker's Goober home page

Products introduced in 1968
The J.M. Smucker Co. brands
Peanut butter brands
Brand name condiments
Honey